Oedo is an island of Geoje city, Gyeongsangnam-do, South Korea.  It is a marine western-style botanical garden in Hallyeohaesang National Park, built by Lee Chang-ho and his wife when they settled on the island in 1969. It was the setting of the 2021 Netflix reality show New World starring Lee Seung-gi, Kai, Kim Hee-chul, Park Na-rae, Jo Bo-ah and Eun Ji-won

History 
In the past, Oedo was just an isolated, barren, rocky island with no electricity or telephone services. Only eight households lived in Oedo, due to its difficult access and lack of a dock in the early years of an independent South Korea.

Mr. Lee and his wife, Choi Ho Suk, gradually created the entire garden. At first, they grew tangerines and bred swine. However, when that failed the two decided to create a botanical garden.

In 1976, their plan was approved to cultivate 1,601,235 ft² of space, growing rare plant species such as Agave americana, windmill palms, and Peruvian cactus. Oedo has a coastal climate with mild and a bit subtropical weather.

Choi Ho Suk has collected a great deal of data about the world's botanical gardens and studied landscaping, architecture, and arbors.

Botanic assets 
The island is home to more than 3,000 plant species including many subtropical plants, such as cactus, palm tree, gazania, sunshine, eucalyptus, bottlebrush bush, New Zealand flax, and agave. It is considered Geojedo's busiest tourist attraction

Ferries 
Transport by ferry is required to access Oedo island. These are available for a fee at several ports within the Hallyeohaesang National park and usually include a professional tour guide and a discussion of the area. To minimize congestion, there are eight paths to the island and the access fee to the island is included in the ferry ride. The ferries typically allow tourists to stay at the island for about 1.5 hours.

Gallery

References

External links
 Oedo tourism
 Oedo featured on JustEnoughKorean.com

Islands of South Gyeongsang Province
Geoje
Tourist attractions in South Gyeongsang Province
Botanical gardens in South Korea
Private islands of South Korea